Isteren is a lake in Engerdal Municipality in Innlandet county, Norway.

Isteren is a nutritious lake with a large diversity of species. It is a popular fishing area, and the chances for the good catch is certainly present. In the summer of 2006, a trout weighing  was caught with a rod from a small boat. It is also rich in whitefish, pike, perch, grayling, burbot and herring. Around the lake there are two fish mounds and some single cabins.

The northern flowing river Sømåa flows into Isteren. It is a river with a rich bird life, especially in the spring. Here one can observe rare species of migrating birds.

See also
List of lakes in Norway

References

Engerdal
Lakes of Innlandet